The Portuguese succession crisis of 1580 came about as a result of the deaths of young King Sebastian I of Portugal in the Battle of Alcácer Quibir in 1578 and his successor and great-uncle Henry I in 1580. As Sebastian and Henry had no immediate heirs, these events prompted a dynastic crisis, with internal and external battles between several pretenders to the Portuguese throne. Because Sebastian's body was never found, several impostors emerged over several years claiming to be the young king, further confusing the situation. Ultimately, Philip II of Spain gained control of the country, uniting the Portuguese and Spanish Crowns in the Iberian Union, a personal union that endured 60 years, during which time the Portuguese Empire declined, being challenged globally during the Dutch–Portuguese War.

The Cardinal-King
The Cardinal Henry, Sebastian's grand-uncle, became ruler in the immediate wake of Sebastian's death. Henry had served as regent for Sebastian after 1562, and succeeded him as king after the disastrous Battle of Alcácer Quibir in 1578. Henry renounced his clerical offices and sought to take a bride for the continuation of the Aviz dynasty, but Pope Gregory XIII, affiliated with the Habsburgs, did not release him from his vows. The Cardinal-King died two years later, without having appointed a Council of Regency to choose a successor.

Claimants to the throne

Portuguese nobility was worried about the maintenance of their independence and sought help to find a new king. By this time the Portuguese throne was disputed by several claimants. Among them were:The descendants of the Duchess of Braganza obtained the throne in 1640 (in the person of her grandson John IV of Portugal), but in 1580, she was only one of several possible heirs. The heir by primogeniture was her nephew Ranuccio Farnese, being the son of Catherine's late older sister Maria, followed by his siblings; then the Duchess herself and her children; and only after them, King Philip. Philip II was a foreigner (although his mother was Portuguese) and descended from Manuel I by a female line; as for Anthony, although he was Manuel I's grandson in the male line, he was of illegitimate birth.

The 11-year-old Ranuccio Farnese, Hereditary Duke of Parma and Piacenza, was the grandson of Infante Duarte of Portugal, the only son of Manuel I whose legitimate descendants survived at that time. Ranuccio was, according to primogeniture, the heir to the throne of Portugal. However, his father Alessandro Farnese, Duke of Parma was an ally of the Spanish king, another contender, so Ranuccio's rights were not claimed at that time. Ranuccio became reigning Duke of Parma in 1592.

Instead, Ranuccio's maternal aunt Catherine, Duchess of Braganza, claimed the throne in an ambitious manner but failed to become queen. Catherine was married to João I, Duke of Braganza (descendant in male line from Afonso I, Duke of Braganza, an illegitimate son of King John I of Portugal), who himself was grandson of the late Duke Jaime of Braganza, also a legitimate heir of Portugal, being the son of Infanta Isabella, sister of Manuel I and daughter of Infante Ferdinand, Duke of Viseu, second son of King Duarte I. The duchess also had a son, Dom Teodósio de Braganza, who would be her royal heir and successor to the throne. The duchess's claim was relatively strong, as it was reinforced by her husband's position as one of the legitimate heirs; thus they would both be entitled to hold the kingship. Moreover, the Duchess was living in Portugal, not abroad, and was not underage, but 40 years old. Her weaknesses were her sex (Portugal had not had a generally recognised queen regnant) and her being the second daughter, thus existing a genealogically senior claimant.

According to primogeniture, the line of succession of the Portuguese throne would have been:
Ranuccio Farnese, Hereditary Duke of Parma and his siblings Odoardo and Margherita
Infanta Catherine, Duchess of Braganza and her children
Philip II of Spain and his children
Maria of Austria, Holy Roman Empress, Philip's sister, and her children
Emmanuel Philibert, Duke of Savoy and his children (son of Beatrice of Portugal, Duchess of Savoy, daughter of Manuel I)

Genealogical summary
Claimants following King Henry I's death (1580)

Other Claimants 
Catherine de' Medici, Queen mother of France, used a claimed descendance from King Afonso III of Portugal from his first marriage with Matilda, Countess of Boulogne to advance with a claim to the Portuguese Throne. Her claim was widely rejected, since she was a very distant relative to King Manuel I of Portugal and because she wasn't actually a descendant of Matilda, but instead of Adelaide of Brabant, who succeeded her as Countess of Boulogne.

The Pope, at the time Gregory XIII, also had a claim to the Portuguese Throne, since King Henry was a Cardinal and the inheritance of all cardinals reverts to the Church. The pope claimed it was his right to have the Kingdom of Portugal, as well as a property that had belonged to the King.

These candidates did not materialized their claims and these were not taken into account when deciding the next King of Portugal.

António of Portugal and Philip of Spain

António, Prior of Crato (1531–1595) was a claimant of the Portuguese throne during the 1580 crisis and, according to some historians, King of Portugal (during a short time (38 days) in 1580 in mainland Portugal, and since then until 1583, in the Azores). António was the illegitimate son of Infante Luis (1506–1555), and therefore grandson of King Manuel I. It was precisely because of his illegitimacy that his claim to the throne was weak and considered invalid. Following the death of King Sebastian, Antonio had put forward his own claim, but his pretensions were overlooked in favour of Cardinal Henry. In January 1580, when the Cortes Gerais were assembled in Almeirim to decide upon an heir, the old Cardinal-King Henry died and the Regency of the Kingdom was assumed by a Council of five members.

Philip II of Spain managed to bring the aristocracy of the kingdom as support to his side. For the aristocracy, a personal union with Spain would prove highly profitable for Portugal at a time when the state finances were suffering. António tried to seduce the people for his cause, comparing the present situation to that of the Crisis of 1385. Then—just as in 1580—the king of Castile had invoked blood descent to inherit the Portuguese throne; and the Master of Aviz (John I), illegitimate son of King Peter I, asserted his right to the throne at the Battle of Aljubarrota, which ended in a victory for John's troops, and in the Cortes of Coimbra in 1385.

On 24 July 1580, António proclaimed himself King of Portugal in Santarém, followed by acclamation in several locations throughout the country; his domestic government lasted for 20 days, until he was defeated in the Battle of Alcântara by Habsburg armies led by the Duke of Alba. After the fall of Lisbon, he purported to rule the country from Terceira Island, in the Azores, where he established a government in exile until 1583; António even had coins minted—a typical assertion of sovereignty and royalty. Some authors consider him the last monarch of the House of Aviz (instead of Cardinal-King Henry) and the 18th King of Portugal. His government in Terceira island was only recognized in the Azores, whereas on the continent and in the Madeira Islands power was exercised by Philip II, who was acclaimed king in 1580 as Philip I of Portugal and recognized as official king by the Cortes of Tomar in 1581. The new king's election was carried on condition that the kingdom and its overseas territories should remain separate from Spain and keep their own laws and Cortes.

After his defeat in the Azores, António went into exile in France—traditional enemy of the Habsburgs—and courted the support of England. An invasion was attempted in 1589 under Sir Francis Drake—leading the so-called English Armada—but ended in failure. António continued to fight until the end of his life for his rights to the throne.

Consequences

The matter of whether Portugal was actually invaded by Spain is contested. Philip II had a legitimate claim to the throne, but as with many other dynastic struggles of the age, it was shrouded in controversy. In any case, life was calm and serene under the first two Habsburg kings; they maintained Portugal's status and gave excellent positions to Portuguese nobles in the Spanish Court, and Portugal maintained an independent law, currency and government. It was even proposed to move the Imperial capital to Lisbon. However, Portugal saw its wealth gradually decreasing. Even though it was an autonomous state, Portuguese colonies came under sustained attack from their enemies, especially the Dutch and English.

Sixty years after these events, John II, Duke of Braganza (1603–1656) accepted the throne offered by the Portuguese nobility, who had become frustrated under Habsburg rule, becoming John IV of Portugal. He was the grandson of Catherine, Duchess of Braganza, who had in 1580 claimed the Portuguese crown, and son of Teodósio II, Duke of Braganza (who died insane in 1630). John was raised to the throne of Portugal (of which he was then held to be the legitimate heir) during the Portuguese Restoration War against King Philip IV of Spain.

There were many impostors who claimed to be King Sebastian, variously in 1584, 1585, 1595, and 1598. "Sebastianism", the legend that the young king would return to Portugal on a foggy day persisted for years, and was even strong into the 1800s.

References

Political history of Portugal
Succession crisis
Succession
Philip II of Spain